General Kirk or Kirke may refer to:

Edward N. Kirk (1828–1863), Union Army brigadier general
John P. Kirk (1867–1952), U.S. Army general
Norman T. Kirk (1888–1960), U.S. Army major general
Paul G. Kirk Sr. (1904–1981), U.S. Army brevet brigadier general
Percy Kirke (British Army officer) (1684–1741), British Army lieutenant general
Percy Kirke (c. 1646–1691), British Army lieutenant general
Walter Kirke (1877–1949), British Army general
William L. Kirk (1932–2017), U.S. Air Force General

See also
James T. Kirk, fictional starship captain and, in some media, admiral